Albert Nikolayevich Oskolkov (born 9 August 1973) is a Russian former professional footballer.

Club career
He made his debut in the Russian Premier League in 1992 for FC Lokomotiv Nizhny Novgorod and played 2 games in the UEFA Intertoto Cup 1997 for them. He played in 109 Premier League matches before he scored his first goal (for Lokomotiv NN in May 1996).

Honours
 Russian Cup finalist: 2000.

References

External links
 

1973 births
Living people
Russian footballers
Association football defenders
Russia youth international footballers
Russia under-21 international footballers
Russian expatriate footballers
Expatriate footballers in Belarus
Russian Premier League players
FC Lokomotiv Nizhny Novgorod players
FC Elista players
FC Metallurg Lipetsk players
FC Moscow players
PFC CSKA Moscow players
FC Yenisey Krasnoyarsk players
FC Volgar Astrakhan players
FC Partizan Minsk players
FC Arsenal Tula players
FC Oryol players
FC Khimik Dzerzhinsk players
FC Novokuznetsk players
FC Spartak Kostroma players
FC Spartak Nizhny Novgorod players
Sportspeople from Nizhny Novgorod